Frederick Heath may refer to:
Johnny Kidd (singer) (Frederick Heath, 1935–1966), English singer and songwriter
Frederick Heath (architect) (1861–1953), American architect
Frederick Heath (cricketer) (1894–1967), English cricketer
Frederick Heath (footballer) (1865–?), English professional footballer

See also
Frederic Heath (1864–1954), American socialist politician and journalist